Stumbledown Romancer is a 1998 studio album by James Dewar. While having been completed in the late 1970s, it was never released until 1998 (Chrysalis), and even then it only had a limited release. Due to its rare nature, it has been sought after by collectors.

Track listing
"Out of Time" (Mick Jagger, Keith Richards)	
"Goodbye Love" (Andy McMaster)	
"Stumbledown Romancer" (Dewar, Matthew Fisher)
"Bright Lights" (Andy McMaster)
"Hosanna" (Dewar, Matthew Fisher)	
"Love's Melody" (Andrew McMaster)
"Sands of Time" (Dewar, Robin Trower)	
"Heartbeat" (Norman Petty)	
"Lay Down the Night" (Andrew McMaster)
"Dance with Me" (Jerry Leiber, Mike Stoller)	
"Nature Child" (Dewar, Matthew Fisher)

Personnel
Bass guitar:
James Dewar 7, 11
David Hayes 1, 8, 10
Alan Jones 2, 4, 6, 9
Paul Westwood 3
Mo Foster 5

Drums:	
Dahoud Shar 1, 8, 10
Peter Van Hooke 2, 6, 9
Dave Mattacks 3, 4, 7
Graham Jarvis 5
Bill Lordan 11

Guitar:
James Dewar 2, 4, 6, 7
John Platania 1, 8
Martin Jenner 5

Guitar acoustic:
James Dewar 7, 10

Hammond organ:
Matthew Fisher 1, 3, 5, 10

Piano:
Matthew Fisher 1, 5
Andy McMaster 2, 4, 6, 9

Electric Piano:
Matthew Fisher 2, 3, 5, 7, 9, 11

Fender Piano:
John Allair 8, 10

Synthesised strings / brass:
Matthew Fisher 3, 4, 6, 10, 11

Synthesiser:
Matthew Fisher 2, 5, 7, 9, 10

Tambourine:
James Dewar 1, 5

Vocal (lead):
James Dewar All

Vocals (harmony):
James Dewar 1, 2, 4, 5, 6, 7, 9

1998 albums
Chrysalis Records albums